Lake Views: This World and the Universe is a 2009 book of 25 essays written by Steven Weinberg. They were published in various periodicals and books in the years 2000 to 2008. The essays deal with science, politics, history, and philosophy.

Essays

1. Waiting for a Final Theory
2. Can Science Explain Everything? Anything? (2001)
3. Peace at Last in the Science Wars
4. The Future of Science, and the Universe (2001)
5. Dark Energy
6. How Great Equations Survive
7. On Missile Defense (2002)
8. The Growing Nuclear Danger (2002)
9. Is the Universe a Computer? (2002)
10. Foreword to A Century of Nature (2003)
11. Ambling toward Apocalypse (2003)
12. What Price Glory? (2003)
13. Four Golden Lessons (2003)

14. The Wrong Stuff (2004)
15. A Turning Point?
16. About Oppenheimer (2005)
17. Einstein's Search for Unification
18. Einstein's Mistakes (2005)
19. Living in the Multiverse (2007); 2005 arXiv preprint (The essay in the book is rewritten for a non-technical readership.)
20. Against the Boycott
21. A Deadly Certitude (2007)
22. To the Postdocs (2007)
23. Science or Spacemen
24. Israel and the Liberals
25. Without God (2008)

Reception

References

External links
 
 

2009 non-fiction books
American non-fiction books
Belknap Press books
Books by Steven Weinberg
English-language books
Essay collections